Aluchehluy, also rendered as Aluchehlu, may refer to:
 Aluchehluy-e Olya
 Aluchehluy-e Sofla